Bad Company are a British rock music band formed in 1973

Bad Company may also refer to:

Film 
 Bad Company (1925 film), an American drama by Edward H. Griffith
 Bad Company (1931 film), an American gangster film by Tay Garnett
 Bad Company (1946 film), a British drama by Paul Barrelet
 Bad Company (1963 film) or Les Mauvaises fréquentations, a film by Jean Eustache
 Bad Company (1972 film), an American Western by Robert Benton
 Bad Company, a 1980 Canadian film by Peter Vronsky
 Bad Company (1984 film) or The Bay Boy, a film by Daniel Petrie
 Bad Company (1986 film), an Argentine drama by José Santiso
 Bad Company (1995 film), an American neo-noir thriller by Damian Harris
 The Nature of the Beast or Bad Company, a 1995 film by Victor Salva
 Bad Company (1999 film), a French film by Jean-Pierre Améris
 Bad Company (2001 film) or Mabudachi, a Japanese film by Tomoyuki Furumaya
 Bad Company (2002 film), an American action-comedy directed by Joel Schumacher

Literature
 Bad Company (comics), a 2000 AD comic strip first published in 1986
 Bad Company (manga), a 1997 Japanese manga (comic) by Tohru Fujisawa
 Bad Company, a 2003 thriller novel by Jack Higgins
 Bad Company, a 1914 book by Yuri Yurkun
 Bad Company, a 1982 book by Liza Cody

Music 
 Bad Company (drum and bass group) or Bad Company UK, an electronic music group formed in 1999
 Bad Company (album), an album by Bad Company
 Bad Company (soundtrack), a soundtrack album from the 2002 film
 "Bad Company" (song), a 1974 song by Bad Company, Rogers & Kirke, covered by Five Finger Death Punch in 2009
 "Bad Company" (song), a song by A$AP Rocky featuring BlocBoy JB, 2018

Other uses 
 Bad Company (video game), a 1990 video game
 Battlefield: Bad Company or Bad Company, a 2008 Electronic Arts video game
 Badd Company, a tag team of Paul Diamond and Pat Tanaka that existed in several wrestling promotions from 1986 to 1994
 Bad Company, a tag team of Bruce Hart and Brian Pillman that existed in the Canadian Stampede Wrestling promotion from 1987 to 1989

See also 
 Bad company fallacy, a kind of logical fallacy
 Evil corporation